Thomas Alvard (1493-1535) was an Ipswich merchant who entered into service with Thomas Wolsey and the Crown. He served as Member of Parliament for Ipswich.

References

1493 births
1535 deaths
Medieval English merchants
Members of the Parliament of England (pre-1707) for Ipswich